Karl Ludwig Frommel (29 April 1789 – 6 February 1863)  was a German landscape painter and engraver, born at Birkenfeld.  He studied at Karlsruhe, under F. J. Becker and Haldenwang, visited Paris, and earned a considerable reputation in Italy (1812–17).  He was appointed professor at Karlsruhe where he founded the Society of Art and Industry.  After a visit to London (1824) to acquaint himself with the technique of steel engraving, he opened a studio, with Henry Winkles at Karlsruhe for that branch of art.  From 1830 to 1858 he was director of the picture gallery, which flourished. He was the father of Emil Frommel.

In popular culture
Parodied in an episode of Animaniacs, wherein he is referred to as "Karl Ludwig Frommage" in a song about cheese, along with "Vincent van Gouda" and "John Bocconcini."

See also
 List of German painters

External links

1789 births
1863 deaths
People from Birkenfeld (district)
19th-century German painters
19th-century German male artists
German male painters